Angus Peter Allan (22 July 1936 – 16 July 2007) was a British comic strip writer and magazine editor who worked on TV Century 21 in the 1960s and Look-in magazine during the 1970s. Most commonly known as Angus Allan and sometimes credited as Angus P. Allan, he was responsible for original comic strip adaptations of numerous popular TV series.

Allan's output was prolific, and virtually all the Look-In comic strips were his creations. Some of his comic works included The Six Million Dollar Man, Logan's Run and Charlie's Angels. Allan collaborated with many well-known British comic strip artists, including Jim Baikie and Arthur Ranson.

Biography
Allan was born in Wimbledon, on 22 July 1936 and attended King's College School there.

Allan's first job in publishing, in late 1952, was as an office junior at Amalgamated Press (later Fleetway, then IPC). He worked on the weekly comic The Comet, and the monthly titles Cowboy Comics and Super Detective Library, edited by Ted Holmes.

Following a period of national service in the Gordon Highlanders from November 1954 to November 1956, having been on active service in Cyprus, Allan returned to Amalgamated Press and after working on Super Detective Library, eventually became co-editor of what was now known as "Cowboy Picture Library", with Alan Fennell. He handled the Davy Crockett and Kansas Kid monthly titles.

Eventually, he was recruited to join the team producing Marty, the first photo-strip teenage romance weekly published by Newnes and Pearson. Here he met his future wife, Gillian, and made the decision to become a freelance writer instead of editing. He has remained a freelance ever since.

Later, he was heavily involved with Alan Fennell's Century 21 Publishing company, becoming associated with Gerry Anderson classics such as Stingray, Thunderbirds, etc. He was also the mainstay scriptwriter for Fennell's Look-In magazine, and at one time was writing every strip in the paper, including DangerMouse.

Allan also wrote for many other outlets, and penned several of the Garth adventures for the Daily Mirror. In January 1990, he and his wife moved to France.

Allan died of cancer on 16 July 2007, having been admitted to hospital the previous Thursday, at least six days before his 71st birthday.

Bibliography
Allan wrote the novelisation of the film Thunderbirds Are Go.

He also wrote a novel of Dan Dare (NEL 1977)

His comics work includes:

Work in TV Century 21

Work in Look-In:

The Six Million Dollar Man
Logan's Run
Charlie's Angels
DangerMouse

References

External links
Interview on Sapphire & Steel fansite

Easter Egg: Interview with writer/script editor Angus Allan, The Gerry Anderson Complete Comic History

1936 births
2007 deaths
Deaths from cancer in England
People educated at King's College School, London
British writers